The following is a list of defunct baseball teams in Canada. It includes the league(s) they played for, and championships won.

Major League Baseball

National League

Minor League Baseball

AAA

International League

Pacific Coast League

AA

Eastern League

A

New York–Penn League

Northwest League

Rookie

Pioneer League

Independent Baseball

Can-Am League

Canadian Baseball League

Frontier League

Golden Baseball League

Northern League

North American League

North Central League

Prairie League Of Professional Baseball

Western Baseball League

College Summer Baseball

Intercounty Baseball League

Western Major Baseball League

See also

Canada national baseball team
List of Major League Baseball players from Canada
Pearson Cup
United Baseball League (proposed)